Jack Goodrich was an attorney from Massillon, Ohio, who became the first manager of the Massillon Tigers of the Ohio League. Outside of his managerial duties, Goodrich also played halfback for the team in 1903.

References

Massillon Tigers players